1 Corinthians 12 is the twelfth chapter of the First Epistle to the Corinthians in the New Testament of the Christian Bible. It is authored by Paul the Apostle and Sosthenes in Ephesus. In this chapter, Paul writes about spiritual gifts and the unity of the members of Christ in one body.

Text 
The original text was written in Koine Greek. This chapter is divided into 31 verses.

Textual witnesses
Some early manuscripts containing the text of this chapter are:
Codex Vaticanus (AD 325–350)
Codex Sinaiticus (330–360)
Codex Alexandrinus
Codex Ephraemi Rescriptus (complete).
Codex Freerianus (extant verses 3–4, 27–28)
Codex Claromontanus

Verse 12

Paul refers to the image of unity in one body in several letters: Romans 12:4–5, Ephesians 4:11–16 and Colossians 2:19. There is a possibility that Paul was familiar with the fable of Menenius Agrippa (died 493 BC), who used the allegory of human body as a plea for civil unity.

"As the body is one": using a simile of a human body which is one unit, Paul speaks of the unity among the believers, and their mutual participation of the various gifts of the Spirit.
"Being many, are one body": as numerous and various as the body parts may be, such as eyes, ears, hands, feet, etc., they all make up but one body, even as they perform different functions, for which they are naturally fitted for the good of the whole.
"So also is Christ" (KJV: "so also to Christ"): The church as one body, in union with Christ, the head, is one general assembly, which members are closely united one to another, denominated from Christ, as their head, and called by Christ's name (Romans 9:3; Jeremiah 33:16).

Verse 31
The final verse in this chapter (verse 31) refers to a "more excellent way", the way of love, which Paul sets out in the next chapter.

See also 
 Holy Spirit
 Related Bible parts: Mark 16, Romans 8, Romans 12, 1 Corinthians 13, 1 Corinthians 14, Ephesians 4, Ephesians 6, 1 Peter 4.

References

External links 
 King James Bible - Wikisource
English Translation with Parallel Latin Vulgate
Online Bible at GospelHall.org (ESV, KJV, Darby, American Standard Version, Bible in Basic English)
Multiple bible versions at Bible Gateway (NKJV, NIV, NRSV etc.)

12